Casey Lisa Reibelt (born 15 January 1988) is an Australian soccer referee who officiates in the A-League Women (W-League prior to 2021) and is an international referee. 

Reibelt took to refereeing at the age of 15. She began officiating in the A-League Women, then known as W-League, in 2008 and has been FIFA listed since 2014. The W-League was rebranded in 2021. She was selected to officiate at the 2019 FIFA Women's World Cup in France.

References

Living people
1988 births
A-League Women referees
Australian soccer referees
FIFA Women's World Cup referees
Women association football referees